Hemidactylus squamulatus, also known as Tornier's leaf-toed gecko or Nyika gecko,  is a species of gecko. It is found in eastern Africa (Ethiopia, Somalia, Kenya, Tanzania).

References

Hemidactylus
Reptiles of Ethiopia
Reptiles of Kenya
Reptiles of Somalia
Reptiles of Tanzania
Taxa named by Gustav Tornier
Reptiles described in 1896